Pen-y-ffordd is a hamlet in Flintshire, Wales. It is located between Holywell and Prestatyn, to the north west of Mostyn.

The actor and writer Emlyn Williams was born here.

References

Villages in Flintshire